Eschweilera tetrapetala is a species of woody plant in the family Lecythidaceae. It is found only in Brazil. It is threatened by habitat loss.

References

tetrapetala
Flora of Brazil
Vulnerable plants
Taxonomy articles created by Polbot